Veronica Burton may refer to:
 Veronica Burton (tennis)
 Veronica Burton (basketball)